The Heaven Sword and Dragon Saber, also translated as The Sword and the Knife, is a wuxia novel by Jin Yong (Louis Cha) and the third part of the Condor Trilogy, preceded by The Legend of the Condor Heroes and The Return of the Condor Heroes. It was first serialised from 6 July 1961 to 2 September 1963 in the Hong Kong newspaper Ming Pao.

Jin Yong revised the novel in 1979 with a number of amendments and additions. A second revision was published in early 2005, incorporating later thoughts and a lengthier conclusion. It also introduced many changes to the plot and cleared up some ambiguities in the second edition, such as the origin of the Nine Yang Manual. As typical of some of his other novels, Jin Yong included elements of Chinese history in the story, such as featuring historical figures like Hongwu Emperor, Chen Youliang, Chang Yuchun and Zhang Sanfeng. The political and ethnic clash between the Han Chinese rebels and the ruling Mongols is also a prominent theme in the novel.

Plot
Set in China towards the end of the Mongol-led Yuan dynasty ( mid 14th century), the story revolves around a pair of highly coveted and allegedly unrivalled weapons, the Heaven-Reliant Sword and Dragon-Slaying Saber. According to a widely circulated mantra, either or both of them are thought to allow their wielder to rule the wulin (martial artists' community), which is divided into an "orthodox" side comprising schools such as Wudang and Shaolin, and an "evil" side represented by the Ming Cult, which is also unflatteringly called the "Demonic Cult". At the start of the novel, the Heaven-Reliant Sword is in the possession of Abbess Miejue, the leader of the "orthodox" Emei School, while the Dragon-Slaying Saber is seized by "Golden-Haired Lion King" Xie Xun, a senior member of the Ming Cult.

The protagonist, Zhang Wuji, has a mixed background: his father, Zhang Cuishan, is an apprentice of Zhang Sanfeng, the highly revered founder of the Wudang School; his mother, Yin Susu, is the daughter of Yin Tianzheng, the chief of the Heavenly Eagle Cult which is affiliated to the Ming Cult. He was born on a reclusive volcanic island, where he spent his childhood with only his parents and his godfather, Xie Xun. When Zhang Wuji was about 10 years old, his parents brought him back to the mainland; Xie Xun remained on the island. After their return, the Zhang family soon find themselves the target of many wulin figures seeking the whereabouts of Xie Xun and the Dragon-Slaying Saber. Zhang Cuishan and Yin Susu refuse to reveal Xie Xun's location and ultimately commit suicide when they are cornered, leaving behind Zhang Wuji as an orphan.

Zhang Wuji, who had been kidnapped and injured earlier, roams the land in search of a cure. By chance, he wanders into an isolated valley, where he discovers the long-lost Nine Yang Manual and uses the inner energy skills described in the manual to heal himself and become a formidable martial artist. Through a series of serendipitous events, he also learns the Ming Cult's most powerful skill, "Heaven and Earth Great Shift". He gets involved in the conflict between the Ming Cult and the six major "orthodox" schools, which are bent on destroying the cult, and helps both sides resolve their past misunderstandings and make peace with each other. The cult members are grateful to Zhang Wuji and insist that he takes up the cult's leadership position, which has been vacant for years. After becoming the Ming Cult's leader, Zhang Wuji reforms the cult and becomes a key figure in leading the wulin and rebel forces to overthrow the Yuan dynasty.

Throughout his adventures, Zhang Wuji finds himself entangled in a complex web of love relationships with four maidens. The first, Zhu'er, is a horribly disfigured girl who is actually his maternal cousin. The second, Xiaozhao, is a Chinese-Persian servant girl who understands him very well. Xiaozhao has to leave China after learning that she is destined to return to Persia to lead the Persian Ming Cult.

The third maiden, Zhou Zhiruo, is Zhang Wuji's childhood friend. She falls in love with him, but has to turn against him as she is bound by an oath she made to her martial arts master, Abbess Miejue, who hates and distrusts Zhang Wuji and anyone related to the Ming Cult. Miejue devises a vicious scheme for Zhou Zhiruo to seize the two weapons by exploiting Zhang Wuji's love for her apprentice. Zhou Zhiruo also turns vicious after Zhang Wuji reneges his promise to marry her and swears vengeance on him.

The fourth maiden, Zhao Min, is a Mongol princess and Zhang Wuji's former arch-rival. Although Zhao Min and Zhang Wuji are initially on opposing sides, Zhao Min gradually falls in love with Zhang Wuji after their various encounters and eventually turns against her fellow Mongols to help him.

At the end of the novel, Zhang Wuji decides to retire from the wulin after he mistakenly believes that the Ming Cult's members are plotting to betray him. He decides that Zhao Min is his true love and they leave to lead a reclusive life far away from society. The second edition of the novel has an ambiguous ending about Zhang Wuji's relationship with Zhou Zhiruo. Zhang Wuji gave up an opportunity to become a ruler when the Ming Cult is on the verge of overthrowing the Yuan dynasty. Ideally, Zhang Wuji would have become the new emperor. In reality, however, his subordinate Zhu Yuanzhang seizes control of the Ming Cult and unites most of China's rebel forces under his leadership. After capturing Nanjing, Zhu Yuanzhang becomes the new emperor and establishes the Ming dynasty.

In 2005, Jin Yong published a third edition of the novel, which has a slightly different ending from the earlier versions. In this edition, Zhang Wuji feels disillusioned after failing to save a general's life and addressing Han Lin'er's death. He relinquishes his leadership of the Ming Cult to his deputies, Yang Xiao and Fan Yao, and then leaves the Central Plain with Zhao Min.

The two weapons

The origins
The two titular weapons, the Heaven Reliant Sword and the Dragon Slaying Saber, were forged from the Heavy Iron Sword, which Yang Guo wielded in The Return of the Condor Heroes.

The Heavy Iron Sword belonged to Dugu Qiubai, a great swordsman whose skills were unmatched in his time. Yang Guo chanced upon the Heavy Iron Sword while he was recovering from the Love Flower's poison and the loss of his right arm. When Yang Guo and Xiaolongnü departed Xiangyang, they left the sword with the couple Guo Jing and Huang Rong. The sword was melted and special steel material was added and it was then forged into the two weapons.

In the third edition of the novel, the Heaven Sword was forged from Yang Guo's Gentleman Sword and Xiaolongnü's Lady Sword while the Dragon Saber's origin remained unchanged.

The secret

Hidden in the blade of the Dragon Saber is the military treatise Book of Wumu by the Song dynasty general Yue Fei. Similarly, concealed in the blade of the Heaven Sword are two scrolls detailing the Nine Yin Manual and Guo Jing's Eighteen Subduing Dragon Palms.

The Dragon Saber was given to Guo Jing and Huang Rong's son Guo Polu, while their younger daughter Guo Xiang inherited the Heaven Sword.

The content of the hidden book and scrolls, in addition to the fact that the weapons can only be damaged and broken when used against each other, was the source of the claim that whoever possesses the Dragon Saber will rule the world and yet only the one who possesses the Heaven Sword can stand against the wielder of the Saber.

The secret of the weapons was passed down only from the leader of each generation of the Emei School to her successor. Miejue is succeeded by Zhou Zhiruo and the secret is passed on to the latter. In the novel, Zhou Zhiruo gains possession of both weapons through her cunning and deception and she breaks them to obtain their contents.

In the latest revision, two halves of an iron-plated map are hidden in the weapons instead of manuals. Once pieced together, the map points out the location of Peach Blossom Island, where the manuals are hidden. Jin Yong reasoned that the change was due to a possibility that the dissection of the weapons will cause the manuals to be burnt, hence two pieces of an iron-plated map would be better substitutes.

Analogy
In Chinese culture, the Dragon is a symbol of the emperor or sovereign ruler. The full translated name of the Dragon Saber is "Dragon Slaying Saber", which implies that it is used to "slay the emperor". In this case, the "emperor" refers to Emperor Huizong of the Yuan dynasty.

Throughout Chinese history, several monarchs have become tyrants, just like when the mythical Dragon goes out of control and becomes a menace. The Heaven Sword's full translated name is "Heaven Reliant Sword" as it embodies Heaven. In Chinese culture, the emperor is respectfully called the "Son of Heaven", which implies that Heaven is the ultimate authority in determining who will be the ruler of China.

It can thus be interpreted as such: The secret in the Dragon Slaying Saber can be used to "kill" (dethrone) the (Mongol) emperor and replace him with another (Han Chinese) ruler. Ideally, a brilliant military leader can use the Book of Wumu to its full potential by staging a rebellion to overthrow the Yuan dynasty and restore Han Chinese rule. However, if the new emperor turns out to be an incompetent monarch or a tyrant, a martial artist can master the skills from the manuals in the Heaven Reliant Sword, assassinate the emperor and replace him with a wise and benevolent ruler.

Characters

Adaptations

Films

Television

Comics
The story was adapted into a manhua series, illustrated by Ma Wing-shing and Jin Yong credited as the writer. In 2002, ComicsOne published an English translation of the manhua as Heaven Sword & Dragon Sabre. While the plot details remain intact, some of the story's events were not presented in the same order as in the novel.

Video games
In 2000, Softworld released a RPG based on the novel. The game ends after the battle at Bright Peak.

In 2004, Softworld released another RPG. Instead of the traditional turn-based RPG, this version has a real-time battle system (similar to Diablo), and follows the entire story.

References

 
1961 novels
Novels by Jin Yong
Novels first published in serial form
Works originally published in Ming Pao
Condor Trilogy
Novels set in the Yuan dynasty
Sequel novels
Novels about orphans
Cultural depictions of Chinese men
Novels about rebels
Novels set on islands
Novels set in the 14th century
Chinese novels adapted into television series
Novels set in Henan
Novels set in Hubei
Novels set in Beijing
Novels set in Anhui
Novels set in Shaanxi
Novels set in Sichuan